Piletocera erebina is a moth in the family Crambidae. It was described by Arthur Gardiner Butler in 1886. It is found on Fiji.

References

erebina
Endemic fauna of Fiji
Moths of Fiji
Moths described in 1886